World Gone Crazy is the fourth studio album by the Australian band The Screaming Jets. The album was released in August 1997 and peaked at number 18 on the ARIA Charts and was certified gold in 1999.

Track listing

Charts and Certifications

Weekly Charts

Certifications

Band members
Dave Gleeson – vocals 
Paul Woseen – bass guitar, backing vocals 
Jimi "The Human" Hocking – guitar 
Craig Rosevear – drums
Grant Walmsley – guitar, backing vocals

External links 
 Official Screaming Jets Website

References

1997 albums
The Screaming Jets albums